M-1 Selection is series of mixed martial arts competitions held by M-1 Global

Fighters are eliminated after only one loss; victory will advance the winning fighters throughout the tournament to the championship event where they will compete for a “M-1 Selection” title.

M-1 Selection # 1 (2009 Season)

M-1 Selection Ukraine # 1 (2009 Season)

M-1 Selection # 2 (2010 Season)

M-1 Selection! 2010 Eastern Europe 1st Round
M-1 Selection! 2010 Asia 1st Round
M-1 Selection! 2010 Western Europe 1st Round
M-1 Selection! 2010 Western Europe 2nd Round
M-1 Selection! 2010 Americas 1st Round
M-1 Selection! 2010 Eastern Europe 2nd Round
M-1 Selection! 2010 Asia 2nd Round
M-1 Selection! 2010 Eastern Europe 3rd Round (Semi Final)
M-1 Selection! 2010 Western Europe 3rd Round (Semi Final)
M-1 Selection! 2010 Americas 2nd Round
M-1 Selection! 2010 Asia Final Episode I
M-1 Selection! 2010 Asia Final Episode II
M-1 Selection! 2010 Eastern Europe Final & Western Europe Final
M-1 Selection! 2010 Asia 3rd Round (Semi Final)
M-1 Selection! 2010 Asia Final

M-1 Selection Ukraine # 2 (2010 Season)

M-1 Selection # 3 (2011 Season)

References

External links
 www.m-1global.com (English)
 www.mixfight.ru (Russian)
 www.mixfight.com.ua (Ukraine)

2009 in mixed martial arts
2010 in mixed martial arts
2011 in mixed martial arts